Derrick Harrison (12 December 1929 – 23 December 1967) was an English professional rugby league footballer who played in the 1950s and 1960s.

Background
Derrick Harrison was born in Wakefield, West Riding of Yorkshire, England, he worked at Leake and Carney, Holmfield Lane, Wakefield, and he died aged-38 in Wakefield, West Riding of Yorkshire, England.

Playing career

County Cup Final appearances
Derrick Harrison played  left-, i.e. number 8, in Wakefield Trinity's 23–5 victory over Hunslet in the 1956–57 Yorkshire County Cup Final during the 1956–57 season at Headingley Rugby Stadium, Leeds on Saturday 20 October 1956.

Notable tour matches
Derrick Harrison played  left-, i.e. number 8, in Wakefield Trinity’s 17-12 victory over Australia in the 1956–57 Kangaroo tour of Great Britain and France match at Belle Vue, Wakefield on Monday 10 December 1956.

Genealogical information
Derrick Harrison's marriage to Mary (née Hopwood) was registered during third ¼ 1952 in Wakefield district. They had children; Denise Harrison (birth registered during fourth ¼  in Wakefield district), and Peter Harrison (birth registered during second ¼  in Wakefield district).

References

External links
Search for "Harrison" at rugbyleagueproject.org

1929 births
1967 deaths
Batley Bulldogs players
English rugby league players
Rugby league players from Wakefield
Rugby league props
Wakefield Trinity players